Memory space can refer to:
Memory space (computational resource), a computer science/information theory concept related to computational resources
Memory space (social science), a sociological concept related to collective memory